Pleurodiscus balmei is a Mediterranean European species of air-breathing land snail, a terrestrial pulmonate gastropod mollusk in the family Pleurodiscidae.

Distribution
This species is known to occur in a number of countries and islands including:
 Italy
 Sicily
 Malta
 Turkey
 Greece
 Syria
 Israel
 Tunisia
 Algeria

It was introduced to southeastern Australia.

This snail also occurs as a "hothouse alien" in:
 Great Britain
 and other areas

References

External links 
 Shell image at : 

Pleurodiscidae
Gastropods described in 1838